Argyria plumbolinealis is a moth in the family Crambidae. It was described by George Hampson in 1896.

References

Argyriini
Moths described in 1896